Malak Rezen ( / ‘Little Slice’) is a peak rising to 2,191 m in northeastern Vitosha Mountain in Bulgaria. The peak is situated 1.5 km northeast of the summit Cherni Vrah, and 1.3 km north by east of Golyam Rezen Peak, surmounting Stenata ski run and Aleko site to the north.

Malak Rezen is accessible by the Romanski chair lift, and serves in turn as a convenient starting point for the three highest peaks of Vitosha Mountain — Cherni Vrah (2,290 m), Golyam Rezen (2,277 m), and Skoparnik (2,226 m).

Rezen Knoll on Livingston Island in the South Shetland Islands, Antarctica is named for the peaks of Malak Rezen and Golyam Rezen.

See also

 Golyam Rezen
 Vitosha
 Mountains in Antarctica

References
 Summit Post: Vitosha.
 Vitosha Nature Park. Website.
 Zone Bulgaria: Vitosha.
 Vitosha Map.

Vitosha
Landforms of Sofia City Province
Mountains of Bulgaria
Two-thousanders of Bulgaria